LeRoy E. Cowles (April 13, 1880 - January 2, 1957) was an American academic administrator. He served as the president of the University of Utah from 1941 to 1946.

References

1880 births
1957 deaths
People from Sanpete County, Utah
People from Orem, Utah
Presidents of the University of Utah
20th-century American academics